Heterodera cajani  (Pigeonpea cyst nematode, Cowpea cyst nematode) is a plant pathogenic nematode affecting pigeonpeas, which is cited as an invasive species.

See also 
 List of pigeonpea diseases

References 

cajani
Vegetable diseases
Agricultural pest nematodes
Nematodes described in 1967